Stevo Todorčević  (born February 9, 1955), is a Yugoslavian mathematician specializing in mathematical logic and set theory. He holds a Canada Research Chair in mathematics at the  University of Toronto, and a director of research position at the Centre national de la recherche scientifique in Paris.

Early life and education
Todorčević was born in Ubovića Brdo. As a child he moved to Banatsko Novo Selo, and went to school in Pančevo. At Belgrade University, he studied pure mathematics, attending lectures by Đuro Kurepa. He began graduate studies in 1978, and wrote his doctoral thesis in 1979 with Kurepa as his advisor.

Research
Todorčević's work involves mathematical logic, set theory, and their applications to pure mathematics.

In Todorčević's 1978 master’s thesis, he constructed a model of MA + ¬wKH in a way to allow him to make the continuum any regular cardinal, and so derived a variety of topological consequences. Here MA is an abbreviation for Martin's axiom and wKH stands for the weak Kurepa Hypothesis.
In 1980, Todorčević and Abraham proved the existence of rigid Aronszajn trees and the consistency of MA + the negation of the continuum hypothesis + there exists a first countable S-space.

Awards and honours
Todorčević is the winner of 
the first prize of the Balkan Mathematical Society for 1980 and 1982,
the 2012 CRM-Fields-PIMS prize in mathematical sciences, and
the Shoenfield prize of the Association for Symbolic Logic for "outstanding expository writing in the field of logic" in 2013, for his book Introduction to Ramsey Spaces.
He was selected by the Association for Symbolic Logic as their 2016 Gödel Lecturer.

He became a corresponding member of the Serbian Academy of Sciences and Arts as of 1991 and a full member of the Academy in 2009.
In 2016 Todorčević became a fellow of the Royal Society of Canada.

Todorčević has been described as "the greatest Serbian mathematician" since the time of Mihailo Petrović Alas.

Books
Todorčević is the author of books in mathematics that include:
Partition problems in topology (1989)
Some applications of the method of forcing (with I. Farah, 1995)
Topics in topology (1997)
Ramsey methods in analysis (with S. A. Argyros, 2005)
Walks on ordinals and their characteristics (2007)
Introduction to Ramsey spaces (2010)
Notes on forcing axioms (2014)

See also
Baumgartner's axiom
Kechris–Pestov–Todorčević correspondence
Open coloring axiom
S and L spaces

References

Sources
.
RSC Fellowship Citation and Detailed Appraisal: Stevo Todorcevic

External links
 CRM Fields PIMS Prize Lecture: Prof. Stevo Todorcevic (photo album)
 CRM-Fields-PIMS Prize Lecture: Stevo Todorcevic (University of Toronto)
 Stevo Todorcevic at University of Toronto
 Stevo Todorcevic at Institut de mathématiques de Jussieu – Paris Rive Gauche
 Todorčević najcenjeniji (Todorčević most respected)
 Dispute over Infinity Divides Mathematicians by Natalie Wolchover, Quanta Magazine, November 26, 2013; contains some comments on choices of axioms for set theory
 Stevo Todorcevic at Institute for Advanced Study
 Prof. Todorčević Interview

Living people
20th-century Serbian mathematicians
21st-century Canadian mathematicians
Combinatorialists
Set theorists
Topologists
Mathematical analysts
Canada Research Chairs
Members of the Serbian Academy of Sciences and Arts
Fellows of the Royal Society of Canada
Academic staff of the University of Toronto
Academic staff of the University of Paris
University of Belgrade Faculty of Mathematics alumni
21st-century mathematicians
1955 births
Tarski lecturers
Canadian people of Serbian descent
Serbs of Bosnia and Herzegovina
Gödel Lecturers
Yugoslav mathematicians